The Doug Owston Correctional Centre, is  an Australian minimum to maximum security prison for males and females.

Facilities
The new correctional facilities deliver education and training programs, rehabilitation and treatment services to prisoners. In addition to the 800 bed correctional centre, the complex has further provision for 200 beds, a 30-bed mental health centre, a 48–bed centre for community based offenders, and a horticulture area for food production.

Construction of the new precinct was delivered through a Public Private Partnership at an estimated cost of 300 million, and was completed late 2014.

See also
 Darwin Correctional Centre

References

Prisons in the Northern Territory
Maximum security prisons in Australia
Buildings and structures in Darwin, Northern Territory
Public–private partnership projects in Australia